Qasim Rashid Ahmad is the founder and chairman of Al-Khair Foundation (AKF), and also the CEO of IQRA TV. Since 2003, Ahmad has managed AKF from concept to delivery of projects, from fundraising to feedback reports, managing donors, staff and volunteers around the world.

He worked as a counsellor and teacher for reforming prisoners for nearly a decade at Her Majesty's Prisons.

Education 
During these years, Ahmad managed various tasks and events.

Experience

Visiting Imam at HMP prison services 
Ahmad worked as a counsellor and teacher for reforming prisoners for nearly a decade at Her Majesty's Prisons. There he engaged in counselling and teaching the offenders, looking after their welfare and helping them to reform and not return to criminal activity after their release from prison.

Chairman and Founder of Al-Khair Foundation (AKF) 

Ahmad named the foundation, ‘Al-Khair’, which is translated to mean ‘goodness’ in Arabic. He created and managed AKF as an Islamic school in Croydon in 2003. It evolved into a service organisation to the UK community first, with an initial focus on education, and also charity work. The Islamic school began with five enrolled pupils. The sports hall was previously a converted warehouse and the school itself was previously an office. By 2013, the school grew into a primary and secondary school with over 350 pupils. AKF then began to build schools overseas for orphans and children from underprivileged communities. This led to AKF's work with widows and vulnerable women, and then to the establishment of the AKF shelters. Eventually AKF launched their water aid and livelihood projects, as well as the AKF medical aid programmes.

In 2005, AKF launched their first Overseas Disaster Relief venture to provide emergency aid during the Kashmir earthquake. That October, and in the winter months which followed, AKF's relief teams provided survivors with medicine, food, shelter kits and moral support. Ever since, AKF has undertaken emergency aid missions all over the world. In this year Al-Khair school also passed their first Ofsted inspection.

In 2010, AKF was a founding member of the Muslim Charities Forum.

AKF has supported the victims of many earthquakes, including the Haiti earthquake and Pakistan floods of 2010, the horn of Africa famine relief, and the Japan earthquake of 2011. Their work in Haiti was recognised by the United Nations in 2010, and they were the only UK Muslim charity working with survivors on the ground in the Japan earthquake of 2011.

In 2012, AKF created their first official partnership- a MoU with Malaysian Red Crescent.

In July 2015, AKF also signed a MoU with the UN to facilitate education for Gazan children.

In 2014, the revenue made by AKF was £21.4 million.

Today, Ahmad is largely involved in AKF's work in the UK, and internationally. He established and oversees many of the charity's aid and development programmes to date.

Campaigns 

AKF's ’Let's Rebuild Pakistan’ campaign was one of the largest international relief efforts in the Foundation's history. To publicise this programme, in the summer of 2011, Ahmad cycled from John O’Groatsin Scotland to Land's End in Cornwall over thirty days. This was shown on the Foundation's dedicated television channel, IQRA TV, which broadcasts to one million households in the UK and helped raise £2,000,000. Ahmad was also named Fundraiser of the Year 2011 by the ‘JustGiving’ donation internet portal. More recently, IQRA TV has expanded to reach out to a Bangladeshi demographic through a new channel called IQRA Bangla.

IQRA TV 
Ahmad is also the CEO of IQRA TV.

In 2007, AKF established their first shelter project in Kashmir, and two years later AKF bought IQRA TV, a free-to-air channel available on Sky TV. IQRA TV's educational Islamic-based programmes including 'Live with IQ', 'IQRA with IQRA', and 'Questions and Answers'.

References

Kenyan chief executives
1970 births
Living people
British Muslims
British imams
People from Saharanpur
British people of Indian descent
Imams in the United Kingdom